Dębiny  is a village in the administrative district of Gmina Przasnysz, within Przasnysz County, Masovian Voivodeship, in east-central Poland.

In 2005 the village had a population of 90.

Cardinal Aleksander Kakowski was born here.

References

Villages in Przasnysz County